Abdullah Seja, is a Pakistani producer and chief operating officer of Idream Entertainment. He has produced more than 100 drama serials under Idream Entertainment. Some of his well known work includes Bay Dardi, Koi Chand Rakh, Qurban, Noor ul Ain, Jhooti, Kaisa Hai Naseeban, and Shehnai.

References

1991 births
Living people
Pakistani producers
People from Karachi